Eleanor M. Fox is an academic who studies antitrust, economic development, globalization, International trade law, and the European Union. She is the Walter J. Derenberg Professor of Trade Regulation in the New York University School of Law.

Education and career
Fox graduated from Vassar College in 1956, and earned an LLB in 1961 from the New York University School of Law.

Before returning to NYU Law, she worked in civil law for the US Attorney's office, and became the first female partner at Simpson Thacher & Bartlett in 1970 . In 1978–1979 she served on the National Commission for the Review of Antitrust Laws and Procedures, and from 1997 to 2000 she served on the International Competition Policy Advisory Committee of the US Department of Justice.

Books
Fox is the author of books including:
Competition Policy and the Transformation of Central Europe (with John Fingleton et al, Centre for Economic Policy Research, 1996)
Making Markets Work for Africa: Markets, Development, and Competition Law in Sub-Saharan Africa (with Mor Bakhoum, Oxford University Press, 2019)

She also wrote the novel W. L. Esquire (1977), a satire concerning a female lawyer in an all-male corporate environment.

Recognition
Fox was the inaugural Alumna of the Year of NYU's alumnae group Law Women in 2006. She was given an honorary doctorate by Paris Dauphine University in 2009. In 2011 Global Competition Review gave Fox a lifetime achievement award for "substantial, lasting and transformational impact on competition policy and/or practice". In 2017 the Association of American Law Schools gave Fox their Antitrust Lifetime Achievement Award.

References

Year of birth missing (living people)
Living people
New York University School of Law alumni
New York University School of Law faculty
Vassar College alumni